Raymond Jack Graydon (born 21 July 1947) is an English former footballer and manager. In a 16-year professional career in the English Football League and North American Soccer League he scored 139 goals in 484 league and cup appearances.

A winger, he began his career at hometown club Bristol Rovers in 1965, and scored 38 goals from 155 league and cup competitions in a six-season stay. He was sold on to Aston Villa for £50,000 in July 1971, and went on to help Villa to win promotion out of the Third Division as champions in 1971–72 and then out of the Second Division in 1974–75. He scored the only goal of the 1975 League Cup Final, and won the League Cup for a second time in 1977. He was also nominated for the Second Division PFA Team of the Year in 1974–75, and featured on the losing side in the 1972 FA Charity Shield. He was sold on to Coventry City for a fee of £35,000 in 1977, and then moved to the United States to play for the Washington Diplomats in 1978, where he picked up a runners-up medal for the 1978 President's Cup Football Tournament. Later in the year he returned to England to play for Oxford United, and retired in 1981.

He coached at Southampton, Oxford United, Watford, Queens Park Rangers and Port Vale, before he was appointed manager of Walsall in May 1998. He led the club to promotion out of the Second Division in 1998–99, before repeating the feat via the play-offs in 2001. He lost his job in January 2002, and was appointed Bristol Rovers manager two months later. He was sacked in January 2004, and later briefly served Leicester City as a first-team coach. In July 2009, Walsall fans voted to honour him with a star on the Birmingham Walk of Stars.

Playing career

Bristol Rovers
Graydon was born in Bristol and began his career with his hometown team, Bristol Rovers, making eight Third Division appearances under Bert Tann in the 1965–66 season. He featured three times in the 1966–67 season, before scoring one goal in 13 appearances in the 1967–68 campaign. Fred Ford took charge at the Memorial Stadium for the 1968–69 season, and Graydon scored nine goals from 36 appearances as the "Pirates" posted a 16th-place finish. Under new manager Bill Dodgin Sr., the "Gas" finished third in the 1969–70 campaign, with Graydon contributing 14 goals from 43 matches. Rovers slipped to sixth-place in 1970–71, with Graydon again scoring 14 goals from 52 appearances.

Aston Villa
In July 1971, Graydon secured a £50,000 move to Aston Villa, with captain Brian Godfrey also moving in the opposite direction. He missed just one of Villa's 46 league games in the 1971–72 season, scoring 14 goals as the club secured the Third Division title with a five-point margin over Brighton & Hove Albion. Derby County and Leeds United declined the chance to play in the 1972 FA Charity Shield, so Villa accepted the invitation to play Manchester City at Villa Park, losing the match 1–0 following a penalty from Francis Lee. Gradyon went on to score ten goals from 37 appearances during the 1972–73 campaign, helping Vic Crowe's side to a third-place finish in the Second Division. He then scored eight goals from 26 matches in the 1973–74 season, as Villa dropped to 14th-place.

After Ron Saunders succeeded Crowe as manager in June 1974, Graydon managed to score 11 goals in the first 12 league matches of the 1974–75 season. The "Villans" then overcame Everton, Crewe Alexandra, Hartlepool United, Colchester United and Chester to reach the 1975 League Cup Final at Wembley Stadium. They faced Norwich City in the final, and Graydon scored the only goal of the game on 79 minutes, converting a penalty won by Chris Nicholl; his penalty was actually saved by Kevin Keelan, but Graydon managed to score from the rebound. He finished the season as the club's top-scorer, claiming 27 goals from 50 appearances, as Villa secured promotion as the division's runners-up. He was named on the Second Division PFA Team of the Year, alongside teammate John Gidman.

Graydon again finished as the club's top-scorer in 1975–76, scoring 14 goals from 44 appearances as Villa posted a 16th-place finish in the First Division. He then scored seven goals from 23 matches in the 1976–77 campaign, helping the club to a fourth-place finish, and he also picked up a second League Cup winner's medal. Villa beat Manchester City, Norwich City, Wrexham, Millwall and Queens Park Rangers, before facing Everton in the final. Graydon was unable to play in the Wembley final or the replay at Hillsborough Stadium due to injury, but was able to make the starting eleven for the second replay at Old Trafford. Again the teams took the game into extra-time, before Brian Little scored the winning goal for a 3–2 victory. At the end of the season Saunders accepted an offer for Graydon from Leicester City, though the move fell through after the player met Leicester manager Frank McLintock.

Later career
Graydon joined Coventry City for the 1977–78 season for a fee of £35,000. Although in and out of the side he still made a significant contribution to what would be one of the most exciting campaigns in the club's 34-year top-flight history. Manager Gordon Milne played the whole season with a 4–2–4 formation with Graydon and Tommy Hutchison playing as out-and-out wingers. The side also boasted Mick Ferguson, Ian Wallace, Terry Yorath, Graham Oakey, Bobby McDonald and Jim Blyth.

The "Sky Blues" finished sixth in the First Division and Graydon left Highfield Road at the end of the season and thereafter had a spell in the North American Soccer League with the Washington Diplomats. The Diplomats finished behind the New York Cosmos in the Eastern Division of the National Conference in the 1978 season, but qualified for the play-offs, where they were beaten by the Portland Timbers. Graydon scored four goals from 26 NASL games. The club also competed in the 1978 President's Cup Football Tournament, finishing as runners-up to South Korea after a 6–2 defeat in the final at the Seoul Stadium.

He joined Oxford United in November 1978, scoring five goals from 19 matches in the 1978–79 season as the "U's" posted an 11th-place finish in the Third Division under the stewardship of Mick Brown. Bill Asprey then took United to a 17th-place finish, with Graydon contributing five goals from 19 games in 1979–80. The 1980–81 season was to prove his final one as a player, as he made only one start in the FA Cup and three substitute appearances in the league.

Coaching career
After retiring as a player, Graydon worked as a coach at Southampton alongside Dave Merrington, and as assistant to Maurice Evans at Oxford United, most notably helping Oxford to the 1986 League Cup. He went on to become the youth team coach at Watford. He led them to victory in the FA Youth Cup in 1988–89, with a 2–1 victory over Manchester City; his team included David James as goalkeeper. He was given the opportunity to manage Walsall in 1989, but turned it down, with the job instead going to John Barnwell. He also went on to work as a youth team coach at Queens Park Rangers. He spent the 1997–98 season assisting John Rudge at Port Vale, helping to steer the "Valiants" away from the First Division relegation zone.

Walsall
Replacing Jan Sørensen as Walsall manager in May 1998, Graydon led Walsall to promotion out of the Second Division as runners-up behind Fulham in 1998–99. Fulham chairman Mohamed Al-Fayed had given manager Kevin Keegan £12 million to spend on Fulham, whereas Graydon spent only £30,000 to bring in Gillingham defender Richard Green. Manchester City and Reading had also spent millions, yet finished behind the "Saddlers". Walsall had been slated as  one of the bookies' favourites for relegation before the season began, having finished in 19th-place in 1997–98 and selling French stars Roger Boli and Jean-François Péron. Within the League Managers Association, Graydon came behind only Alex Ferguson in the poll for Manager of the Season. He stuck to a rigid 4–4–2 system, and picked up 12 away wins operating a counter-attacking system. His best signing proved to be midfielder Darren Wrack, who came on a free transfer from Grimsby Town and went on to be voted onto the PFA Team of the Year. He also brought in left-back Neil Pointon and striker Andy Rammell. He maintained strict discipline, stressing that "fitness is absolutely vital".

He was unable to keep the club in the First Division, as they were relegated at the end of the 1999–2000 season, finishing three points adrift of safety. He was named as Second Division Manager of the Month for August 2000. In the 2000–01 season, Graydon led Walsall to a fourth-place finish and then to the Second Division play-off final at the Millennium Stadium – defeating Reading 3–2 after extra time to regain promotion to the First Division at the first attempt. Instead of celebrating immediately, Graydon embraced with Reading manager Alan Pardew, and shook the hand of each Reading player, including former Walsall captain, Adi Viveash. His second spell in the First Division was just as unsuccessful as the first, and after a dismal performance in the January Black Country derby with West Bromwich Albion, Graydon was sacked. His successor, Colin Lee, kept Walsall up at the end of the 2001–02 season.

Bristol Rovers
On 25 April 2002, Graydon returned to his hometown club to manage Bristol Rovers, who had finished second-from-bottom of the English Football League in 2001–02, warning that "if you have a sick patient then surgery is required and, in this instance, I have to administer that surgery." The following day he published his retained list, releasing 13 players from the club. He led Rovers to a 20th-place finish in the Third Division in 2002–03, before he was sacked in January 2004, with the club then in 12th-place and fans beginning to turn on him and his "negative football".

Later career
Since leaving Bristol Rovers, Graydon accompanied Howard Wilkinson to manage in China during 2004. In February 2006, Graydon was appointed as first-team coach at Leicester City by manager Rob Kelly. He left the club at the end of the 2005–06 season. In July 2009, Walsall fans voted to honour him with a star on the Birmingham Walk of Stars on Broad Street.

Career statistics

Playing statistics
Source:

Managerial statistics

Honours

Player
Individual
PFA Team of the Year (Second Division): 1974–75

Aston Villa
Football League Third Division: 1971–72
Football League Second Division second-place promotion: 1974–75
FA Charity Shield runner-up: 1972
League Cup: 1975 & 1977

Washington Diplomats
President's Cup Football Tournament runner-up: 1978

Manager
Individual
Football League Second Division Manager of the Month: August 2000

Walsall
Football League Second Division second-place promotion: 1998–99
Football League Second Division play-offs: 2001

References

1947 births
Living people
Footballers from Bristol
English footballers
England youth international footballers
Association football wingers
Bristol City F.C. players
Bristol Rovers F.C. players
Aston Villa F.C. players
Coventry City F.C. players
Washington Diplomats (NASL) players
Oxford United F.C. players
English Football League players
North American Soccer League (1968–1984) players
English football managers
Walsall F.C. managers
Bristol Rovers F.C. managers
English Football League managers
Association football coaches
Watford F.C. non-playing staff
Southampton F.C. non-playing staff
Oxford United F.C. non-playing staff
Queens Park Rangers F.C. non-playing staff
Port Vale F.C. non-playing staff
Leicester City F.C. non-playing staff
English expatriate sportspeople in the United States
Expatriate soccer players in the United States
English expatriate footballers